These are the full results of the athletics competition at the 1989 Jeux de la Francophonie which took place on 12–17 July 1989, in Casablanca, Morocco.

Men's results

100 meters

Heats – 13 July

Semifinals – 14 JulyWind:Heat 1: +0.3 m/s, Heat 1: +2.2 m/s

Final – 14 JulyWind: +1.9 m/s

200 meters
Final – 18 JulyWind: +1.1 m/s

400 meters

Semifinals

Final – 16 July

800 meters

Heats

Semifinals

Final – 14 July

1500 meters

Heats

Final – 18 July

5000 meters
14 July

10,000 meters
18 July

Marathon
18 July

110 meters hurdles

Heats

Final – 14 JulyWind: +0.7 m/s

400 meters hurdles

Heats

Final – 18 July

3000 meters steeplechase
14 July

4 × 100 meters relay
18 July

4 × 400 meters relay
18 July

20 kilometers walk
13 July

High jump
16 July

Pole vault
17 July

Long jump
13 July

Triple jump
18 July

Shot put
13 July

Discus throw
18 July

Hammer throw
17 July

Javelin throw
14 July

Decathlon
13–14 July

Women's results

100 meters

Heats – 13 July

SemifinalWind: +0.2 m/s

Final – 14 JulyWind: +1.9 m/s

200 meters

Heats – 13 July

Final – 18 JulyWind: +0.9 m/s

400 meters

Heats

Semifinals

Final – 16 July

800 meters

Heats

Final – 14 July

1500 meters
18 July

3000 meters
17 July

10,000 meters
18 July

Marathon
18 July

100 meters hurdles

Heats

Final – 13 JulyWind: -0.3 m/s

400 meters hurdles
18 July

4 × 100 meters relay
18 July

4 × 400 meters relay
18 July

High jump
17 July

Long jump
16 July

Shot put
17 July

Discus throw
18 July

Javelin throw
13 July

Heptathlon
16–17 July

References

Jeux de la Francophonie
1994